Patty H. Kim (born July 29, 1973) is an American politician. A Democrat, she is a member of the Pennsylvania House of Representatives representing the 103rd district, serving since 2013. She previously served on the Harrisburg, Pennsylvania City Council.

Early life and education
Kim was born on July 29, 1973. Kim graduated from Langley High School in 1991 and Boston College in 1995. Kim's father immigrated from Korea after the Korean War.

Television career
Prior to her career in elected office, Kim was a television reporter as well as a television production assistant; associate
producer, and news anchor.

Political career

Harrisburg City Council
Kim served on the Harrisburg City Council from 2006 to 2012, serving two terms. She served as vice president of the council.

Pennsylvania House of Representatives

Elections
In 2011, Kim announced that she would run for state House District 103 the next year, challenging incumbent Ron Buxton, a fellow Democrat, in the primary election. Buxton ultimately decided to not run for reelection. In the 2012 primary, Kim defeating Roy Christ, Karl Lewis Singleton, and Gloria E. Martin-Roberts, receiving 28.81% of the vote; Christ received 28.03%, Singleton 24.4%, and Martin-Roberts 18.76%. She ran unopposed in the general election.

In the 2014 election, Kim defeated Gina L. Roberson in the Democratic primary, receiving 78.42% of the vote to Roberson's 21.58%. Kim ran unopposed in the 2014 general election.

In 2016, Kim defeated opponent Richard Soto in the Democratic primary, receiving 89.41% of the vote to Soto's 10.58%. She ran unopposed in the 2016 general election.

In the 2018 election, Kim ran unopposed in the  Democratic primary. In the November 2018 general election, Kim defeated Republican nominee Anthony Thomas Harrell, receiving 83.98% of the vote to Harrell's 16.02%.

Tenure
Over several sessions in the state House, Kim was a leader in efforts to increase in Pennsylvania's state minimum wage from $7.25 an hour to $15 an hour. Kim also sponsored legislation that would expunge the criminal records of persons convicted of non-violent crimes who do not commit another crime for at least seven years.

Kim, who is Korean American, is the first Asian-American to serve in the Pennsylvania House of Representatives.

In 2015, Kim recruited six other House Democrats from inner-city districts across the state to go to block parties to reach out to voters to increase awareness for more education spending in state budget.

In 2019, Kim supported calls by Harrisburg Mayor Eric Papenfuse for a state-appointed receiver to assume control of the long-troubled Harrisburg School District, which has been plagued by financial mismanagement, poor academic performance, and high employee turnover.

In 2019, Kim was the sole Democrat in the state House to support a pension reform proposal that would switch a traditional pension plan for state workers to a 401(k)-style plan.

Kim currently sits on the Appropriations, Education, Finance, Insurance, and Local Government committees.

Personal life
Kim is married to John Sider; they have two children.

Kim is a major supporter and sponsor of the Tri-Community Basketball Association.

References

External links
Official campaign website
Official legislative website

Living people
Boston College alumni
Harrisburg City Council members
Women state legislators in Pennsylvania
Democratic Party members of the Pennsylvania House of Representatives
American women of Korean descent in politics
Asian-American people in Pennsylvania politics
1973 births
21st-century American politicians
21st-century American women politicians
Women city councillors in Pennsylvania
Asian-American city council members